Taus Makhacheva (born August 14, 1983) is a contemporary artist from Russia. She creates works that explore the restless connections between historical narratives and fictions of cultural authenticity. Often humorous, her art considers the resilience of images, objects and bodies emerging out of stories and personal experiences. Her methodology involves reworking of materials, landscapes and monuments, pushing against walls, opening up ceilings and proliferating institutional spaces with a cacophony of voices.

Family

Grandfather: Rasul Gamzatov -  avar poet, prose writer, publicist, Soviet and Russian public and political figure, translator, the Laureate Stalin and Lenin Prizes, People's Poet of Dagestan ASSR, Hero of Socialist Labor (1923-2003).

Grandmother: Patimat Gamzatova -  Head of the Dagestan Museum of Fine Arts (1964-2000).

Mother: Patimat Gamzatova - art historian, Сorresponding Member of the Russian Academy of Arts, Honored Culture Worker of Dagestan Republic.

Father: Osman Makhachev  - Doctor of Medical Sciences, professor, Honored Doctor of the Russian Federation.

Education

 2011-2013 – MA Fine Art, Royal College of Art, London
 2008-2009 –  New Strategies in Contemporary Art, The Institute of Contemporary Art, Moscow
 2003-2007 – BA (Hons) Fine Art (Studio Practice & Contemporary Critical Studies), Goldsmiths College, University of London, London
 2002-2003 – Foundation Diploma in Photography, London College of Communication, London
 2000-2005 Russian State University for the Humanities, World Economy, Moscow

Selected collections 

  Art Gallery of Ontario, Ontario
  Centre Pompidou, Paris 
  (GfZK) Galerie für Zeitgenössische Kunst, Leipzig
  Gazprombank, Moscow
  Kadist Art Foundation, Paris, San Francisco 
  Los Angeles County Museum of Art, Los Angeles
  Louis Vuitton Foundation, Paris 
  Moscow Museum of Modern Art, Moscow
  Museum of Modern Art, Antwerp 
  Musée cantonal des Beaux-Arts, Lausanne 
  National Centre for Contemporary Arts, Moscow
  Pushkin Museum, Moscow
  P. S. Gamzatova Dagestan Museum of Fine Arts, Makhachkala 
  Sharjah Art Foundation, Sharjah
  Tate Modern, London 
  Tretyakov Gallery, Moscow
  Uppsala Konstmuseum, Uppsala 
  Van Abbemuseum, Eindhoven 
  Vehbi Koç Foundation, Istanbul
  Videoinsight Foundation, Turin
  YARAT Contemporary Art Space, Baku

Prizes 

  2021 Kandinsky Prize, Media Art, shortlisted, Moscow 

  2021 Art Here 2021 Richard Mille Art Prize. Memory, Time, Territory, Abu Dhabi Louvre, shortlisted, Abu Dhabi 

  2019 Future Generation Art Prize, shortlisted, Victor Pinchuk Foundation, Kyiv 

  2018 Cosmoscow 2018, Artist of the Year, Cosmoscow Foundation for Contemporary Art, winner, Moscow  

  2016 Kandinsky Prize, Young Artist, Project of the year, winner, Moscow (as Super Taus)  

  2015 VI Moscow Biennale of Contemporary Art Prize, winner, Moscow 
 
  2013 Future of Europe, winner, (GfZK) Galerie für Zeitgenössische Kunst, Leipzig  
 
  2013 Innovation Prize, Regional Project, shortlisted, National Centre for Contemporary Art, Moscow  

  2012 Innovation Prize, New Generation, winner, National Centre for Contemporary Art, Moscow  

  2011 Kandinsky Prize, Media Art, shortlisted, Moscow

Selected solo exhibitions 

2022

Space of Celebration, curated by Lucas Morin, Nora Razian, Jameel Arts Center, Dubai 

2021

It’s Possible to Raise the Ceiling a Bit, curated by Hanne Hagenaars, Fries Museum, Friesland 

2020

4`224,92 cm’2 of Degas, сurated by Nicole Schweizer, Musée cantonal des Beaux-Arts, Lausanne 

Hold Your Horses, curated by Helen Watson and Melissa Burntown, The Tetley, Leeds 

Sturdy Black Shoes, curated by Edit Molnar and Marcel Schwierin, Edit Russ Haus für Medienkunst, Oldenburg 

2019

Superhero Sighting Society, conceived by Sabih Ahmed and Taus Makhacheva, KADIST Foundation, Paris 

Charivari, curated by Suad Garayeva-Maleki, Yarat Contemporary Art Space, Baku 

D’une pierre, une montagne, curated by Nicolas Audureau, LE CAP - Centre d'arts plastiques de Saint-Fons, Saint-Fons 

The Strong Ones, curated by Lýdia Pribišová, Hit Gallery, Bratislava 

2018

Storeroom, curated by Christiane Berndes, Van Abbemuseum, Eindhoven 

BaidÀ, narrative projects, London 

Baida, Althuis Hofland Fine Arts, the Gemma, Amsterdam

Tightrope, curated by Rebecka Wigh Abrahamsson, Uppsala Konstmuseum, Uppsala   

2017

Cloud Caught on a Mountain, curated by Alexey Maslyaev, Moscow Museum of Modern Art, Moscow 

Second World, Third Attempt, Leo Xu Projects, Shanghai 

2015

Vababai Vadadai!, narrative projects, London

(In)sidenotes, curated by Rebecka Wigh Abrahamsson, Uppsala Konstmuseum, Uppsala 

2014

Dagestan. Not for sale, curated by Alexey Maslyaev, artSumer, Istanbul 

A Walk, A Dance, A Ritual, curated by Ilina Koralova, (GfZK) Galerie für Zeitgenössische Kunst, Leipzig  

2013

What? Whose? Why?, curated by Daria Kirsanova, Raf Projects, Tehran 

Story Demands to be Continued, curated by Alexey Maslyaev, Republic of Dagestan Union of Artists Exhibition Hall, Makhachkala 

On Historical Ideals of Labour in the Country that Conquered Space, curated by Carlos Noronha Feio, The Mews Project Space, London  

The Process or Instance of Breaking Open, curated by Emmeli Person and Maria Kotlyachkova, Kalmar Konstmuseum, Kalmar 

2012

City States, Topography of Masculinity, curated by Irina Stark and Kelly Klifa, the 7th Liverpool Biennial, LJMU Copperas Hill Building, Liverpool 

Let Me Be Part of A Narrative, curated by Alexey Maslyaev, Paperworks Gallery, Winzavod, Moscow 

2011

Affirmative Action (mimesis), curated by Marco Scotini, Laura Bulian Gallery, Milan 

2010

Affirmative Actions, curated by Alexey Maslyaev, Panopticon Inutero, Moscow 

2009

A Space of Celebration, Pervaya Gallery, Makhachkala, Dagestan

Selected group exhibitions

2022

In the heart of another country, curated by Dr Omar Kholeif, Contemporary Art of Deichtorhallen Hamburg, Hamburg 

I'm Stepping High, I'm Drifting, and There I Go Leaping, curated by Weng Xiaoyu, Xiao Museum of Contemporary Art, Shandong 

The Circus We Are, curated by Joanna De Vos, Namur, Four locations in Namur - Le Delta, musée Félicien Rops, Musée des Arts Anciens, Belgian Gallery, Namur 

Hurting and healing. Let's imagine a different heritage, curated by Charles Esche, Tensta Konsthall, Stockholm 

Migrations in Art – the Art of Migrations, curated by Danilo Vuksanović, Jelena Ognjanović and Luka Kulić, Novi Sad 

Moving Woman, curated by Maria Lind, Smena, Kazan 

2021

Biennial of Difficult Heritage, curated by Anton Valkovsky, Volgograd 

One Point Five, curated by Stefanie Böttcher, Kunsthalle Mainz, Mainz   

Hands, curated by Madhursee Dutta and Ala Younis, Akademie der Künste der Welt, Köln    

Metamorphosis and Time of Mourning, curated by Daniela, Linda Dostálková, PLATO Ostrava, Ostrava    

2020

Afterglow, Yokohama Triennale, curated by Raqs Media Collective, Yokohama  

Lahore Biennale 02: Between the Sun and the Moon, curated by Sheikha Hoor Al-Qasimi, Lahore  

2019

Cosmopolis #2: Rethinking the Human, curated by Kathryn Weir with associate Cosmopolis curator Ilaria Conti in collaboration with associate curators Charléne Dinhut and Zhang Hanlu, Centre Pompidou, Paris  

New Archive of Limited Edition Art (NATI), Shaltai editions exhibition, сurated by Irina Gorlova and Antonio Geusa, Tretyakov Gallery, Moscow   

Somewhere in Between, curated by Ulrika Flink, Boras Konstmuseum, Boras 

Art Encounters Biennial, curated by Maria Lind and Anca Rujoiu, Timișoara 

Where Water Comes Together with Other Water, curated by Adélaïde Blanc, Daria de Beauvais, Yoann Gourmel, Mat-thieu Lelièvre, Vittoria Matarrese, Claire Moulène, Hugo Vitrani, 15th Lyon Contemporary Art Biennale, Fagor Factory, macLYON, Lyon Museum of Contemporary Art, Lyon  

The Life of Things, curated by Maria Wills Londono in collaboration with Audrey Genois and Maude Johnson,16th MOMENTA Biennale de l’image, Galerie de l'UQAM, Montreal, Quebec  

Happiness is Born in the Guts, curated by Jagna Domżalska, Galeria Miejska Arsenal, Poznan  

The Art of Being Good, curated by Siim Preiman, Tallinn Art Hall, Tallinn  

After Leaving | Before Arriving, curated by Elisabeth Del Prete, Daniel Milnes, Lýdia Pribišová, Neringa Stoškutė and Alessandra Troncone, 12th Kaunas Biennial, M. K. Čiurlionis National Museum of Art, Kaunas  

Future Generation Art Prize, curated by Björn Geldhof and Tatiana Kochubinska, 58th International Art Exhibition - La Biennale di Venezia, collateral event, Palazzo Ca’ Tron, Venice  

The Keeper; To Have And To Hold, curated by Emer McGarry, The Model, Sligo 

Future Generation Art Prize, curated by Björn Geldhof and Tatiana Kochubinska, Pinchuk Art Centre, Kyiv  

2018

Punk Orientalism, curated by Sara Raza, MacKenzie Art Gallery, Regina, Saskatchewan   

Rituals of Signs and Metamorphosis, curated by Tarek Abou El Fetouh, Red Brick Art Museum, Beijing   

Tomorrow Will Be Yesterday, curated by Andrey Misiano, ERTY gallery, Tbilisi   

Alter Heroes Coalition, curated by Daria Khan, Mimosa House, London (as Super Taus)   

Supernature in Two Parts: Part I, curated by Daria Khan and Mimosa House, Lisson Gallery, London (as Super Taus)   

The Border, curated by Inke Arns and Thibaut de Ruyter, Goethe Institute at the Museum and Exhibition Complex of the Russian Academy of Arts, Ekaterinburg, Almaty and Tashkent   

Beautiful World, Where Are You?, curated by Kitty Scott and Sally Tallant, 10th Liverpool Biennial, Liverpool 

Transformatio. Contemporary Art of Dagestan, curated by Maria Filatova, Mardjani Foundation, Erarta Museum, Saint Petersburg 

One Place After Another, curated by Viktor Misiano and Anna Zhurba, session IV of Viktor Misiano's "The Human Condition", Jewish Museum and Tolerance Centre, Moscow 

The Planetary Garden. Cultivating Coexistence, curated by Bregje van der Haak, Andrés Jaque, Ippolito Pestellini Laparelli, Mirjam Varadinis, Manifesta 12, Palermo 

Starting From the Desert, curated by Marco Scotini, 2nd Yinchuan Biennale, Museum of Contemporary Art Yinchuan, Yinchuan 

Everything Was Forever, Until It Was No More, curated by Katerina Gregos,1st Riga International Biennial of Contemporary Art, Riga 

Soon Enough, Art in Action, curated by Maria Lind, Tensta Konsthall, Stockholm 

2017

Life from My Window, curated by Andrey Misiano, Laura Bulian gallery, Milan 

New Literacy, curated by Joao Ribas, 4 Ural Industrial Biennial, Ekaterinburg 

The Travellers: Voyage and Migration in New Art from Central and Eastern Europe, curated by Magdalena Moskalewicz, Kumu Art Museum, Tallinn 

The Border, curated by Inke Arns and Thibaut de Ruyter, Goethe Institute at Ioseb Grishashvili Tbilisi History Museum (Karvasla), Tbilisi 

How To Live Together, curated by Nicolaus Schafhausen, Kunsthalle Wien, Vienna 

Viva Arte Viva, curated by Christine Macel, 57th International Art Exhibition, La Biennale di Venezia, Venice 

Space Force Construction, curated by Matthew Witkovsky, Richard and Ellen Sandor (Art Institute Chicago), Katerina Chuchalina with Anna Ilchenko (V-A-C Foundation), Peter Taub, Palazzo delle Zattere, Venice 

1st Garage Triennial of Russian Contemporary Art, curated by Kate Fowle, Katya Inozemtseva, Snejana Krasteva, Andrey Misiano, Ilmira Bolotyan, Sasha Obukhova, Tatiana Volkova, Garage Museum of Contemporary Art, Moscow 

The Border, curated by Inke Arns and Thibaut de Ruyter, Goethe Institute, Moscow, St. Petersburg, Krasnoyarsk, Kiev, Minsk, Dortmund 

2016

The Withdrawal of the Red Army, curated by Ivan Galuzin and Lise Dahl, Northern Norway Art Museum, Blaker Old Dairy, Oslo 

Why Won’t We Ask Again? Arguments, Counter-arguments and Stories, curated by Raqs Media Collective, 11th Shanghai Biennale, Power Station of Art, Shanghai 

Social Calligraphies, curated by Magda Kardasz, Zachęta National Gallery, Warsaw 

Millennials, curated by Mirjam Westen, Museum Arnhem, Arnhem 

Performing the Landscape, curated by Lorenzo Fusi, TRUCK Contemporary Art, Calgary 

VII Permanent Collection Display Interaction: Contemporary Artists Respond to MMOMA Collection, curated by Elena Yaichnikova, MMOMA, Moscow 

The Travellers, curated by Magdalena Moskalewicz, Zachęta National Gallery, Warsaw 

Museum ON/OFF, curated by Alicia Knock, Centre Pompidou, Paris 

But Still Tomorrow Builds into My Face, curated by Nat Muller, Lawrie Shabibi gallery, Dubai 

Lost in the Archive, curated by Inga Lace and Andra Silapetere, Exhibition hall Riga Art Space, Riga 

Baroque, Galerie Fons Welter, Amsterdam 

minus20degree Art & Architecture Winter Biennale, curated by Theo Deutinger and Heinz Riegler, minus20degree art and architecture biennale, Flachau, Austria.

2015

Otwock, Season 5: Silvohortiaromatherapy, curated by Kasia Redzis and Magda Materna, Otwock, held by Open Art Projects and Polish artist Mirosław Bałka, Muzeum Ziemi Otwockiej (Museum of the Otwock Land), Otwock  

How to Gather? Acting in a Center in a City in the Heart of the island of Eurasia, curated by Bart De Baere, Defne Ayas and Nicolaus Schafhausen, 6th Moscow Biennale of Contemporary Art, VDNH, Moscow 

The School of Kyiv, Kyiv Biennial, curated by Hedwig Saxenhuber and Georg Schollhammer, Visual Culture Research Center, Kyiv 

Too Early, Too Late. Middle East and Modernity, curated by Marco Scotini, Pinacoteca Nazionale di Bologna, Bologna  

2014

Russian Performance: a Cartography of its History, curated by Yulia Aksenova and Sasha Obukhova, Garage Museum of Contemporary Art, Moscow  

Untitled... (Native Foreigners), curated by Andrey Misiano, Garage Museum of Contemporary Art, Moscow  

An Opera of Labour and Revolution, curated by Lanfranco Aceti and Susanne Jaschko, Kasa Gallery, Istanbul 

Close and Far: Russian Photography Now, curated by Kate Bush, Calvert 22, London  

So Long, and Thanks for All the Fish, Lawrie Shabibi, Dubai 

Sergey Parajanov. The Color of Pomegranate, сurated by Zaven Sargsyan, Vyacheslav Shmyrov, Katya Bochavar and Daria Khan, GROUND Solyanka Gallery, Моscow  

2013

Spaces of Exception, curated by Elena Sorokina and Jelle Bouwhuis, 5th Moscow Biennale of Contemporary Art, special project, ARTPLAY Design Center, Moscow  

Nostalgia Nervosa, curated by Iliana Fokianaki, State of Concept, Athens   

Sensible Action, curated by Beral Madra, Alanika 2013, National Museum of Republic Northern Ossetia-Alania, Vladikavkaz   

No Water Tomorrow, curated by Alexey Maslyaev, Moscow Museum of Modern Art, Moscow   

Love me, Love me not, curated by Dina Nasser-Khadivi, 55th International Art Exhibition - La Biennale di Venezia, collateral event, Venice   

The Enchanted Wanderer, curated by Andrey Misiano, Chukotka Heritage Museum Center, Anadyr  

Re:emerge, Towards a New Cultural Cartography, curated by Yuko Hasegawa, 11th Sharjah Biennial, Sharjah 

Looks Like Torture, curated by Nicholas Cohn and Amy Kisch, HERE Art Center, New York   

Take a Look at Yourself, Who Do You Think You Are?, curated by Andrey Parshikov, Victoria Gallery, Samara   

2012

I am who I am, curated by Olga Sviblova, Kunst im Tunnel, Dusseldorf, Germany 

Quarantania, curated by David Thorp, Enclave, London 

Animal Style, curated by Ilya Shipilovskikh, National Centre for Contemporary Arts, Ekaterinburg 

Happiness is a Warm Gun, curated by Ekaterina Shadkovska, Rizzordi Art Foundation, Loft Raf, Saint Petersburg 

Quarantania, curated by David Thorp, John Hansard Gallery, Southampton 

Joyful Archipelago, curated by Olga Grotova, Guest Projects, London 

Now&Then, Victoria Gallery, Samara 

Migrasophia, curated by Sara Raza, Maraya Contemporary Art Centre, Sharjah 

Génération P, Town Hall, Le Kremlin-Bicêtre  

2011

Rewriting Worlds, curated by Peter Weibel, 4th Moscow Biennale of Contemporary Art, ARTPLAY Design Center, Moscow 

Expanded Cinema, curated by Olga Shishko, XII Media Forum of 33rd Moscow International Film Festival, Moscow Museum of Modern Art, Moscow  

Get Up and Run Away With It – About Love and the Impossible, curated by Nadine Wietlisbach, Palais Bleu Le-Lie, Trogen  

Greater Caucasus, curated by Irina Yashkova, PERMM Museum of Contemporary Art, Perm, Russia 

North Caucasian Biennale, curated by Djamilia Dagirova, Pervaya Gallery, Makhachkala 

Practice for Everyday Life, curated by David Thorp, Calvert 22, London 

2010

History of Russian Video Art, Volume 3, curated by Antonio Geusa, Moscow Museum of Modern Art, Moscow 

Zones of Alienation, curated by Marina Fomenko, LOT gallery, Lexington 

Intimate Capital, curated by Andrey Parshikov and Alena Lapina, 2nd Moscow International Biennale for Young Art “Stop! Who goes there?”, Proekt Fabrika, Moscow 

2009

Aluminium, curated by Leyla Akhundzadeh, 4th International Biennale of Contemporary Art, Baku  

Let Me Think!, curated by Stanislav Shuripa, the Parallel Program of the 3rd Moscow Biennale of Contemporary Art, Red October, Moscow  

Really?, curated by Aleksandr Sokolov, the Parallel Program of the 3rd Moscow Biennale of Contemporary Art, Artplay, Moscow 

Topography of Happiness: Russian Wedding from the 19th to the 21st Centuries, curated by Olga Sosnina, Tsaritsyno State Museum, Moscow 

We Will Take the Lead From Now On, curated by Arseniy Zhilyaev and Maria Chekhonadskih, Voronezh Center for Contemporary Art, Voronezh 

2008

Migration, curated by Daria Kamyshnikova, 1st  Moscow International Biennale for Young Art “Stop! Who goes there?”, Moscow Museum of Modern Art, Moscow 

I Am Nature, curated by Stanislav Shuripa, 1st  Moscow International Biennale for Young Art “Stop! Who goes there?”, Contemporary City Foundation, Moscow 

Documenting Possibilities, curated by Stanislav Shuripa, Valand School of Fine Art, Gothenburg

2006

Caucasica, curated by Giancarlo Vianello, Scuola Grande di S.Giovanni Evangelista, Venice

XII INTERBIFER International Biennale of Portrait, Drawings and Graphics 06, Tuzla

Residencies 

 2019 Kadist Foundation, Paris 
 2018 SAM Art Project, Paris 
 2018 Aki Aora, Tulum 
 2016 Civitella Ranieri, Umbertide 
 2015-2016 Jan Van Eyck Academie, Maastricht 
 2015 Delfina Foundation, London 
 2013 Alanica, Art Symposium, Vladikavkaz

Academic сareer

Artist talks 

 2022 Open meeting with Taus Makhacheva, as part of the Family Ethnography course by Elmira Kakabaeva 
 2022 Artist talk at M HKA, Antwerpen 

 2022 Virtual Class Visit, Princeton University  

 2022 Artist talk at Tselinny Center, Astana 
  
 2022 In Conversation: Taus Makhacheva and Madina Tlostanova, Jameel Arts Center 

 2022 Art Space SKLAD, online, Sukhumi  

 2021 Territory Festival, MMOMA, Moscow  
 
 2021 Fries Museum, Leeuwarden  

 2021 Blazar young art fair, Moscow  

 2021 Masters & Nova Art, online, Saint Petersburg  

 2021 The Tetley, online, Leeds  

 2020 British Higher School of Art & Design, Moscow 
 2020 School of Fine Art, History of Art and Cultural Studies, University of Leeds, Leeds 
 2019 LOOP Talks 2019, Barcelona
 2018 Liverpool Biennial, Liverpool 
 2017  In - conversation with Andrey Kovalev, Garage Education Center, Moscow 

 2017 Talk for the members of the C-MAP Central and Eastern European group, Garage, Moscow 
 2016 Goldsmiths, London 

 2016 Open Studios, MMOMA, Moscow 

 2015 In - conversation with curator Kasia Redzisz, Institute of Contemporary Arts, London 
 2013 Yarat Contemporary Art Space, The International Mugham Center, Baku 

 2013 At the Crossroads: Conversation with Taus Makhacheva, Contemporary art from Caucasus, Sotheby’s, London

 2012 Calvert22
 2012 In - conversation with Sara Raza, Cultural Representations, Migrasophia, Maraya Contemporary Art Centre, American University of Sharjah, Sharjah
 2011 British Higher School of Art & Design, Moscow

Invited guest lectures and studio visits 

 2022 Online program Possibilities and methods in international career, CEC ArtsLink
 2022 Tashkeel Guest Mentoring as a part of Critical Practice Programme 2022
 2021 Guest lecture and studio visit at St.Joost School of Art and Design
 2021 Art and practices of hospitality, Vyksa
 2021 Territory Festival, Moscow
 2020 ICA Moscow (Institute of Contemporary Art)
 2020 The Studio Visit, educational project, Worldwide online
 2011- 2021 British Higher School of Art & Design, Moscow
 2021 Fries Museum, Leeuwarden
 2018 Liverpool Biennial, Liverpool
 2012 Calvert 22

Lectures and teaching 

 2011- 2021 British Higher School of Art & Design, Moscow
 2016 - 2017 Russian Institute of Theatre Arts – GITIS, Moscow
 2014 The Art Department of Dagestan State Pedagogical University, Makhachkala
 2013 Dagestan Art School n.a. M.A.Djemal, Makhachkala
 2009 Moscow State University (elective course on the History of Performance) 
 2009 Pervaya Gallery, Makhachkala—Kaspiysk

Performative lectures 

 2019 The Superhero Summit, produced by KADIST in collaboration with ‘Cosmopolis #2: rethinking the human’, Paris 

 2017 Field Meeting Take 5: Thinking Projects - "Microbeads", curator Leeza Ahmady, Asia Contemporary Art Week, Asia Society Museum & SVA Theatre, New York 

 2015  3rd Garage international conference: "Where is the line between us?: Cautionary tales from now", Garage, Moscow (Super Taus)

Panel discussions 

 2022 Uzbekistan National Pavilion sessions ‘Decolonizing Data On the Myth of Machine Objectivity’

 2018 The artist: What We Are Made Of, Cosmoscow, Moscow

 2017 Contemporary art and contemporary art science, HSE University, Art and Design, Moscow

 2015 Reaching out: (Beyond) the Caucasus, ArtBasel, Hong Kong

 2014 Close and Far, Calvert22, The Courtauld Institute of Art, London

 2011 Art schools: how to become an avant-garde artist, XV Art - Moscow International  Contemporary Art Fair, Moscow

Workshops 

 2022 Space of celebration, Super Taus workshop for children, Jameel Arts Centre 

 2021 Territory Festival, Moscow 

 2018 Soon Enough, art in action, Super Taus workshop for children, Tensta konsthall, Stockholm  

 2017 The Garage Triennial of Russian Contemporary Art, Garage Atrium, Moscow (Super Taus)  

 2012 South London Gallery, London

Conferences 

 2022 Tate and Institut National d’histoire de l’art (INHA) conference, Paris 

 2021 Art and practices of hospitality, Vyksa 

 2019 The Superhero Summit, produced by KADIST in collaboration with ‘Cosmopolis #2: rethinking the human’, Paris 

 2014 Beyond Moscow, Glocal art scene in Dagestan, NCCA, Moscow 

 2013 Performative aspects of masculinity, Makhachkala City Museum, Makhachkala

Publications 

 Raza, Sara. Punk Orientalism: The Art of Rebellion. Dog Press, 2022
 Dekker, Elsbeth; Schweige, Robbie. Beginning in the Middle. Jap Sam Books, 2022
 Phaidon Editors. Prime - Art’s Next Generation, Phaidon Press, 2022 
 Tlostanova, Madina. Decoloniality of being, knowledge and feeling, Tselinnii, 2020
 Schweizer, Nicole; Z. Rizvi Uzma, van Velsen, Vincent ed, Taus Makhacheva. 4`224,92 cm’2 of Degas, Fondation du Musée cantonal des Beaux-Arts, 2020
 Burrows, Dani, Cezar Aaron ed. Politics of Food, co-published by Delfina Foundation and Sternberg Press, 2019
 Kholeif, Omar. The Artists Who Will Change the World, Thames and Hudson, 2018
 Makhacheva, Taus. Tightrope, V-A-C Press, Mousse Publishing, 2017
 Makhacheva, Taus. Types du Caucase. Onestar Press, 2014
 Makhacheva, Taus; Maslyaev, Alexey ed. Story Demands to Be Continued. Self-published, 2013
 Amirsadeghi, Hossein; Vickery, Joanna ed. Frozen Dreams: Contemporary Art from Russia, Thames and Hudson, 2011

Interviews 

 Artist of the Week: Taus Makhacheva, as a part of HANDS exhibition, Akademie der Kuenste der Welt, 2021
 Interview with Taus Makhacheva, Part 5, Edith-Russ-Haus for Media Art, 2021
 Interview by Masha Komarova,Glavstroy, 2021
 Taus Makhacheva: My doubts became part of my method, Russian Art Focus, 2021
 Taus Makhacheva: Hold Your Horses at The Tetley, The Tetly, 2020 
 Superhero Sighting Society, Kadist, Paris, 2019
 Beauty School: a conversation with Taus Makhacheva, Art in America, 2018
 The Art Newspaper Russia, 2018.08
 The Art Newspaper Russia, Taus Makhacheva: art as a balancing act, 2018.07
 Artists talk: Taus Makhacheva and Evgeny Antufiev, Harper’s Bazaar, 2016
 Art Guide, 2015

Articles 

 Wynants, Jean-Marie. The Circus we are à Namur. Les acrobaties de l'art, Le Soir, August 2022
 Bidshahri, Yalda. Taus Makhacheva`s “A Space of Celebration”. ArtAsiaPacific, June 2022
 Duplat, Guy. Bienvenue dans le grand cirque de la vie, La libre Belgique. May 2022
 The artists. Taus Makhacheva. Daily Canvas. The Richard Mille Special Issue.
 Sinha, Vamika. Art from the Fault Lines. Canvas, May-June, 2022
 Dekker, Elsbeth; Schweiger, Robbie. Beginning in the middle. Mister Motley, April 2022
 Beredian, Razmig. Russian artist Taus Makhacheva entwines the real with reveries in solo Dubai show. The National, March 2022
 Ex, Nicole. Taus Makhacheva. See All This Art Magazine, No. 20, 2020/2021
 Schellenberg, Samuel. Taus Makhacheva. Remodelage. Le courrier, March 2020
 House, Arthur. Bread and Soviet circuses – a letter from Baku. Taus Makhacheva, Charivari’ installation, October 2019
 Serafinowicz, Sylwia. Taus Makhacheva. narrative projects. ArtForum, December 2018
 Verhagen, Marcus. Taus Makhacheva. BaidÀ. narrative projects. Art Monthly, November 2018
 Jeffreys, Tom. In Search of the Ridiculous: Taus Makhacheva’s Performative Follies. Frieze, 7 October 2018
 Sutton, Kate. Taus Makhacheva. Openings. ArtForum, February 2016
 Ahmady, Leeza. From Central Asia to the Caucasus. In conversation with Taus Makhacheva. Ibraaz, March 2015
 Pertenava, Lali. Taus Makhacheva. ArtForum, February 2014
 Bailey, Stephanie. Her Dagestan. ArtAsiaPacific No.87, 2014
 Laia, Joao. Taus Makhacheva. Frieze magazine No.160, 2014
 Tolstova, Anna. Continuation of heart and hand. Taus Makhacheva in Makhachkala. Kommersant No.187(5218), 2013
 Avdeev, Maxim. One day with Taus Makhacheva, Art Chronika No. 4, 2012
 Scotini, Marco. Strategies of Camouflage. Taus Makhacheva’s actions. ArteCritica No.67, 2011
 Chekhonadskikh, Maria. Shots into the Sand by Taus Makhacheva. Moscow Art Magazine No.81, 2010
 Gamzatova, Patimat. Karakul by Taus Makhacheva. ANTENNAE No.4, 2007

Links 
 Vimeo channel

References 

1983 births
Living people
Russian women artists
Russian contemporary artists